Van der Veer is a Dutch toponymic surname meaning "from the ferry". Variants include Van 't Veer and Van de Veer. Abroad the parts of the surname are often merged in various ways.  Notable people with the surname include:

Cornelia van der Veer (1639–1704), Dutch poet
Frank Van der Veer (1921–1982), American special-effects artist
Jeroen van der Veer (born 1947), Dutch businessman, former CEO of Royal Dutch Shell
Nevada Van der Veer (1884–1958), American contralto singer
Peter van der Veer(born 1953), Dutch anthropologist
Willard Van der Veer (1894–1963), American cinematographer who filmed the Byrd Antarctic Expedition
Willem van der Veer (1887–1960), Dutch film actor 
Van 't Veer
Laura J. van 't Veer (born 1957), Dutch molecular pathologist
Vanderveer etc.
Abraham Vanderveer (1781–1839), U.S. Representative from New York
Albert Vander Veer (1841–1929), American surgeon
Bruce Vanderveer (born 1970s), American record producer known as "Automatic"
Ellinor Vanderveer (1886–1976), American actress
Ferdinand Van Derveer (1823–1892), American Union Army general
George Vanderveer (1875–1942), American labor lawyer
Heidi VanDerveer (born 1964), American basketball coach
Tara VanDerveer (born 1953), American basketball player and coach
Vandeveer
Ferdinand Vandeveer Hayden (1829–1887), American geologist
Logan Vandeveer (1815–1855), Texas pioneer, ranger and civic leader
Michael Vandeveer (fl. 1980s), American (Indiana) politician
Ray Vandeveer (born 1953), American (Minnesota) politician
Stacy D. VanDeveer (born 1967), American international relations scholar

See also
Mount Van der Veer, Antarctic mountain named for Willard Van der Veer
Vander Veer (disambiguation)

References

Dutch-language surnames
Surnames of Dutch origin
Dutch toponymic surnames